Senator Ayer may refer to:

Caleb Ayer (1813–1883), Maine State Senate
Claire D. Ayer (born 1948), Vermont State Senate